Howard Fish is a former competitive judo who fought for the United States. He was a left-handed fighter. He won gold in the 1965 National Collegiate Championships.

In 1967, Fish defeated future Olympian Allan Coage. He appeared on the 1968 cover of Black Belt Magazine. In 1968, Fish received a four month scholarship from Black Belt Magazine in order to train at the Kodokan. He represented San Jose State and the USA in the 1968 World University Judo Games, where he won two bronze medals.  Fish was the only representative of the United States in this tournament.

Howard won bronze in the 1966 US National Championships, and gold in the 1967 US National Championships.

Personal life
Fish initially attended General Motors Institute of Technology before transferring to San Jose State.

References

American male judoka